Those marked in bold have now been capped at full international level.

Group A

Head coach: Philippe Bergeroo

Head coach: Kenny Shiels

Head coach: Juan Santisteban

Head coach:

Group B

Head coach: Paul Gludovatz

Head coach: John Peacock

Head coach: Carlos Alberto Lopes Dinis

Head coach: Viktor Kashchey

Footnotes

UEFA European Under-17 Championship squads
Squads